= Filipino Catholic Church =

Filipino Catholic Church or Philippine Catholic Church may refer to:

- Catholic Church in the Philippines
- Philippine Independent Church, officially known as Iglesia Filipina Independiente and colloquially called the "Aglipayan Church"
